Oskar Hoffmann may refer to:

 Oskar Hoffmann (painter) (1851–1912), Baltic-German painter from Estonia
 Oskar Hoffmann (author) (1866–1928), German science-fiction writer
 Oskar Hoffmann (politician) (1877–1953), German editor and politician